The 1924 college football season was the year of the Four Horsemen as the Notre Dame team, coached by Knute Rockne, won all of its games, including the Rose Bowl, to be acclaimed as the best team in the nation.  Notre Dame and Stanford were both unbeaten at season's end, with the Fighting Irish winning the Rose Bowl contest 27–10. The Penn Quakers were retroactively awarded a national championship by Parke H. Davis.

Red Grange's Illinois team upset Michigan. The Illini were upset by Minnesota, which in turn was upset by Vanderbilt. Fred Russell's Fifty Years of Vanderbilt Football dubs 1924 "the most eventful season in the history of Vanderbilt football." Centre claimed a southern title in its last season of national relevance, upsetting Wallace Wade's first SoCon champion Alabama team. Alabama would not lose another game until 1927.

Conference and program changes

Conference changes
Three new conferences began play in 1924:
Missouri Intercollegiate Athletic Association – active NCAA Division II conference now known as the Mid-America Intercollegiate Athletics Association
Texas Intercollegiate Athletic Association – conference active through the 1930 season
West Virginia Intercollegiate Athletic Conference  – NAIA and NCAA Division II conference active through the 2013 season
One conference played its final season in 1924:
California Coast Conference –  originally established in 1922

Membership changes

September

September 27 
California with a 13–7 win over Santa Clara.  Dartmouth beat Norwich College 40–0.  Southern Methodist University (SMU) beat North Texas 7–0, and Alabama opened with a 55–0 win over Union College of Tennessee.

October
October 4  Missouri opened its season with a 3–0 win at Chicago, the Maroons' only loss of the season.  Notre Dame opened its season with a 40–0 win over Lombard College.  Stanford beat Occidental College 20–6, and California beat St. Mary's 17–7.  Army beat St. Louis 17–0,  Yale beat North Carolina 27–0, and Dartmouth beat Montreal's McGill University 52–0.  Alabama won at Furman 20–0.  SMU beat Trinity College 14–3

October 11 
Notre Dame beat Wabash 34–0.  Stanford beat the Olympic Club 7–0 and California defeated Pomona College, 28–0.  Army beat Detroit's Mercy College, 20–0 and Dartmouth beat Vermont 38–0.  In a battle of Bulldogs, Yale beat Georgia 7–6.  Missouri defeated Missouri Wesleyan College 14–0 (MWC was closed in 1930).   Chicago beat visiting Brown, 19–7.  Alabama beat Mississippi College 51–0.  In a Friday game, SMU beat Austin College 7–0

October 18 At the Polo Grounds in New York, Notre Dame beat Army 13–7, the Cadets' only loss for the season.  In his column the next day, sportswriter Grantland Rice dubbed the Notre Dame backfield (Harry Stuhldreher, Don Miller, Jim Crowley, and Elmer Layden) in his column of October 20, writing "Outlined against a blue-gray October sky, the Four Horsemen rode again. In dramatic lore they are known as famine, pestilence, destruction and death. These are only aliases. Their real names are: Stuhldreher, Miller, Crowley and Layden. They formed the crest of the South Bend cyclone before which another fighting Army team was swept over the precipice at the Polo Grounds this afternoon as 55,000 spectators peered down upon the bewildering panorama spread out upon the green plain below."

In other games, Yale and Dartmouth played to a 14–14 tie.  Stanford defeated Oregon 28–13, while California beat the Olympic Club 9–3.  In Birmingham, Alabama beat Sewanee 14–0.  SMU beat Texas 10–6.  Missouri won at Iowa State 7–0, and Chicago defeated Indiana 23–0.

October 25 Notre Dame beat Princeton 12–0.   In Columbus, Chicago and Ohio State played to a 3–3 tie.  At Portland, Oregon, Stanford had a more difficult time than expected in defeating Idaho, 3–0, while California beat Washington State 20–7.  Army beat Boston University 20–0, Dartmouth beat Harvard 6–0, and Yale defeated Brown 13–3.  At Atlanta, Alabama recorded another shutout, beating Georgia Tech 14–0.  SMU and Texas A & M played to a 7–7 tie in Dallas.  Missouri beat Kansas State 14–7.

November
November 1 
California and USC, both unbeaten and untied with records of 5–0–0, met at Berkeley, with California handing the Trojans their first defeat, 7–0.
Notre Dame beat visiting Georgia Tech 34–3
Stanford beat Santa Clara 20–0 and California beat visiting USC 7–0
Army and Yale played to a 7–7 tie.  Dartmouth defeated Brown 10–3.
SMU stayed unbeaten with a 6–0 win at TCU.  Missouri suffered its first defeat, a 14–6 loss at Nebraska.  Chicago beat Purdue 19–6.

Alabama registered its 8th shutout in a 61–0 win over Ole Miss at Montgomery.  To that point, the Crimson Tide had outscored its opposition 215–0.

November 8  Notre Dame won at Wisconsin 38–3
In a game at Berkeley, Stanford beat Utah 30–0, while in Seattle, California was tied by Washington.
Army beat visiting Florida 14–7, Dartmouth beat Boston University 38–0, and Yale beat Maryland 47–0
SMU was tied at Arkansas 14–14.
Alabama gave up its first points in a 42–7 win over visiting Kentucky.  Missouri won at Oklahoma 10–0.
Chicago and Illinois played to a 21–21 tie.

November 15  Notre Dame beat Nebraska 34–6
Stanford beat Montana 41–3 and California beat Nevada 27–0
Army and Columbia played to a 14–14 tie, and Yale beat Princeton 10–0.  In New York, Dartmouth closed its season unbeaten with a 27–14 win over Cornell.
Alabama was defeated by Centre College, 17–0, in a game at Birmingham.
SMU and Baylor played to a 7–7 tie in Dallas.  Missouri beat Washington University in St. Louis 35–0.  Chicago beat Northwestern 3–0.

November 22  In Chicago, Notre Dame beat Northwestern 13–6
Stanford (7–0–0) and California  (7–0–1) were both unbeaten going into the final game of the season, played at Berkeley.  The teams played to a 20–20 tie, with Stanford getting the bid to the Rose Bowl; California hosted a postseason game against Penn for New Year's Day
Yale closed its season unbeaten with a 19–6 win over Harvard.   Chicago and Wisconsin played to a scoreless tie.

On Thanksgiving Day, November 27 Alabama beat Georgia 33–0 in Birmingham.  Missouri beat Kansas 14–0, and received an invitation to play USC at the Los Angeles Christmas Festival (where it would lose, 20–7)

Notre Dame closed its season in Pittsburgh on Friday, November 28, with a 40–19 win over Carnegie Tech.
In the Army–Navy Game, held in Baltimore, Army won 12–0
On November 29 SMU and Oklahoma State played to a 13–13 tie, giving the Mustangs a season record of 5 wins, no losses and four ties.

Rose Bowl

Notre Dame had the Four Horsemen; Stanford had Ernie Nevers.  Neither team had lost a game in 1924 and they met in Pasadena before a crowd of 52,000.   The Stanford Indians took a 3–0 lead in the first quarter after Murray Cuddeback's field goal.  In the second quarter, Elmer Layden ran for one touchdown, then scored another after picking off an Ernie Nevers pass and returning the interception to give the Irish a 13–3 lead at halftime.  Stanford closed the gap to 13–10 in the third quarter with a pass from Ed Walker to Ted Shipkey, but lineman Ed Hunsinger scooped up a fumble from an attempted Stanford punt return to give Notre Dame its third touchdown.  In the last quarter, Stanford was stopped eight inches from the goal line.  Layden picked off another Nevers pass and returned it 70 yards for the final score, with Notre Dame winning 27–10.

Other bowls
 Dixie Classic
 Los Angeles Christmas Festival

Conference standings

Major conference standings

Independents

Minor conferences

Minor conference standings

Awards and honors

All-Americans

The consensus All-America team included:

Statistical leaders
 Player scoring most points: Heinie Benkert, Rutgers, 100 (16 touchdowns and four extra points)
 Total offense leader: Red Grange, Illinois, 1176

References